Donald McLeod (28 May 1882 – 6 October 1917) was a Scottish professional footballer who made over 260 appearances in the English and Scottish Leagues for Middlesbrough and Celtic respectively. A right back, he was capped by Scotland and represented the Scottish League XI. McLeod was nicknamed 'Slasher'.

Personal life 
Born in Laurieston, McLeod grew up in Grangemouth and Stenhousemuir and was married with three daughters. After his retirement from professional football in 1914, he took over the Lord Byron pub in Middlesbrough. In 1916, two years after the outbreak of the First World War, McLeod was conscripted into the Royal Garrison Artillery. He was subsequently transferred to the Royal Field Artillery and became a gunner. On 5 October 1917, during the Battle of Passchendaele, McLeod was wounded in action, losing his right leg below the knee and part of his left foot. He died of wounds the following day at the 47th Casualty Clearing Station in Dozinghem, near Poperinge. McLeod was buried in Dozinghem Military Cemetery.

Career statistics

Honours 
Celtic

 Scottish League First Division (4): 1904–05, 1905–06, 1906–07, 1907–08
 Scottish Cup (2): 1906–07, 1907–08
 Glasgow Cup (2): 1904–05, 1906–07

References

Sources

External links

London Hearts profile

1882 births
1917 deaths
Scottish military personnel
Scottish footballers
Scotland international footballers
Association football fullbacks
Stenhousemuir F.C. players
Celtic F.C. players
Middlesbrough F.C. players
Scottish Football League players
English Football League players
British Army personnel of World War I
Scottish Football League representative players
Royal Field Artillery soldiers
British military personnel killed in World War I
Royal Garrison Artillery soldiers
Footballers from Falkirk (council area)
Ayr F.C. players
Caledonian F.C. players